A Rough Draft is a 2018 Russian science fiction film directed by Sergey Mokritskiy, based on the 2005 novel of the same name by Sergei Lukyanenko and starring Nikita Volkov,  Yulia Peresild and Yevgeny Tsyganov. It was released in Russia on May 25, 2018.

Plot 
A young resident of Moscow, Kirill is a talented designer of computer games. One day, he is completely erased from the memory of everyone he knew and loved. Kirill learns that he is chosen for an important and mysterious mission. His purpose is to become a customs officer between parallel worlds, of which there are dozens in the universe.

Kirill learns to open the portals to a variety of parallel worlds which represent alternative versions of Moscow: a steampunk Imperial Russia, a post-apocalyptic tropic resort world, a dystopian Gulag world, and a highly advanced utopian world. Over time, Kirill learns that our Earth is a rough draft, a setting for social experiments secretly staged by the government of the utopian world, in order to avoid our mistakes. Learning this, Kirill rebels against his supervisors.

Cast
 Nikita Volkov  as Kirill Maksimov
 Yevgeny Tkachuk  as Kotya Chagin
 Olga Borovskaya  as Anna
 Yulia Peresild  as Rose White
 Severija Janušauskaitė  as Renata Ivanova
 Yevgeny Tsyganov  as Anton
 Elena Yakovleva  as Kirill's mother
 Andrey Rudensky  as Kirill's father
 Andrey Merzlikin  as Felix
 Irina Khakamada  as Irina, politician
 Sergei Lukyanenko  as the train passenger

Critical reception
Although the film was one of the most anticipated Russian releases of 2018, it received generally negative reviews from professional critics, receiving 32% on KinoPoisk. The majority of criticism was focused on CGI, acting and an incomprehensible storyline.  Critics also panned the film for its changes from the novel. Observer of Kommersant Mikhail Trofimenkov in his review notes that by multiplying the fantasy worlds above the necessary number, the authors doomed the film to madness of entropy. Equally helpless, in the opinion of the author, is the actor's work. Critic Alexey Lytovchenko (Rossiyskaya Gazeta) wrote that in some places it is impossible to differentiate the characters and understand their motives.

А Rough Draft underperformed in the box office.

References

External links
 

2010s science fiction films
Russian science fiction action films
Films based on science fiction novels
Films based on Russian novels
Films set in Moscow
Films shot in Moscow
Films about parallel universes
Columbia Pictures films